Kathugu is a settlement in Kenya's Embu County, formerly known as the Eastern Province.

References 

Populated places in Eastern Province (Kenya)